Sellana (Greek: Σέλλανα) is a former municipality in the Karditsa regional unit, Thessaly, Greece. Since the 2011 local government reform it is part of the municipality Palamas, of which it is a municipal unit. The municipal unit has an area of 89.490 km2. Population 4,551 (2011). The seat of the municipality was in Proastio, which has 1,833 inhabitants. Other communities in the municipal unit are those of Marathea, comprising the villages Marathea (655) and Korda (246), with a combined population of 901, Agia Triada (699), Pedino (696) and Kalogriana with a population count of 589.

Subdivisions
The municipal unit Sellana is subdivided into the following communities (constituent villages in brackets):
Agia Triada
Kalogriana
Marathea (Marathea, Korda)
Pedino
Proastio

Population

External links
Official website
 Sellana on GTP Travel Pages

References

Populated places in Karditsa (regional unit)

el:Δήμος Παλαμά#Σελλάνων